Lilies of the Field is a 1930 American Pre-Code drama film directed by Alexander Korda, and starring Corinne Griffith, Ralph Forbes, and John Loder. It was a remake of the silent 1924 film Lilies of the Field, in which Griffith had played the same role. Both films were based on a 1921 play of the same name by William J. Hurlbut. Lilies of the Field was Griffith's first all-dialogue film. The film is not related in any way to the 1963 film of the same name.

Plot
Walter Harker (Loder), who is married to Mildred Harker (Griffith), falls in love with another woman and wants to separate from his wife without losing custody of his daughter. He frames his wife and files for divorce, and Mildred ends up losing her daughter.

Mildred moves into a cheap apartment and gradually becomes a Broadway showgirl and drowns her depression in a life of alcohol and jazz. Ted Willing (Forbes), a wealthy man, becomes her devoted admirer, but after her experience with her ex-husband, Mildred finds it hard to trust anyone. When Willing offers Mildred financial help, she refuses to accept anything, fearing that her daughter may hear about it. Eventually, she realizes that her daughter has completely forgotten about her and allows Willing to take care of her. One day, while she is at a party, Mildred hears of her daughter's death and has a breakdown. She later is jailed for vagrancy and disorderly conduct. Willing comes to the police station and rescues her.

Cast
 Corinne Griffith – Mildred Harker
 Ralph Forbes – Ted Willing
 John Loder – Walter Harker
 Eve Southern – Pink
 Jean Laverty – Gertie
 Tyler Brooke – Bert Miller
 Freeman Wood – Lewis Conroy
 George Beranger – Barber
 Douglas Gerrard – Headwaiter
 Rita La Roy – Florette
 Betty Boyd – Joyce
 May Boley – Maizie
 Virginia Bruce – Doris
 Charles Hill Mailes – Judge
 Raymond Largay – Harker's lawyer
 Joseph E. Bernard – Mildred's lawyer
 Tenen Holtz – Paymaster
 Wilfred Noy – Butler
 Anne Schaefer – First maid
 Clarissa Selwynne – Second maid

Songs
The theme song for the movie, titled "I'd Like to Be a Gypsy", was written for the film by Ned Washington and Michael H. Cleary. Cleary also wrote "Mechanical Ballet" (a.k.a. "Speed") for the film. This latter number was featured in a Broadway number sequence.

Preservation status
No copies of this film are known to exist, and it is believed that the film is now lost. Fragments of the  "Mechanical Ballet"  sequence are preserved in the 1932 Joe E. Brown comedy film The Tenderfoot.

See also
List of lost films

References

Bibliography
 Kulik, Karol. Alexander Korda: The Man Who Could Work Miracles. Virgin Books, 1990.

External links

1930 films
Lost American films
1930s English-language films
Films directed by Alexander Korda
First National Pictures films
Warner Bros. films
American films based on plays
Films set in New York City
1930 drama films
American black-and-white films
1930 lost films
Lost drama films
1930s American films